Municipal elections were held in Milan on 13 May 2001 to elect the Mayor of Milan and the 60 members of the City Council.

The incumbent Mayor Gabriele Albertini easily won a second term in office, defeating the centre-left candidate and former trade unionist Sandro Carlo Antoniazzi.

The municipal elections occurred on the same day of the national general election which was heavily won by Silvio Berlusconi's House of Freedoms, a circumstance that largely influenced also the local vote. In this election, the Mayor was elected for the first time for a five years term, in accordance to a new local administration Law approved in 2000.

Background
During his first 4-years term as Mayor, Gabriele Albertini usually referred himself as a "condominium administrator", underlining his soft attitude to the government of the city: Albertini's popularity was extremely high since his administration seemed more like the one of a manager heading an enterprise. Describing himself as a man of the civil society, he managed to identify and subdivide municipal affairs with the politically and economically closest interests, choosing trusted men for the top management jobs of large municipal companies and banks and creating a real network of alliances with the social and economical powers of the city, such as businessmen, stylists and bankers.

On the other side, moreover weakened by the national government's extreme unpopularity, the centre-left coalition was unable to find a way to fit into this system of power.

Campaign

As Albertini decided to conduct a low profile campaign, benefiting from Berlusconi's national campaign (Berlusconi himself was candidate in the constituency of Milan City Centre for the Chamber of Deputies), the semi-unknown centre-left candidate Sandro Antoniazzi struggled to emerge as a competitive contender to the office of Mayor. Moreover the centre-left coalition was deeply divided, with the Federation of the Greens (FdV) and Italy of Values (IdV) parties presenting their own mayoral candidates (respectively the environmentalist activist Milly Moratti and the notorious former magistrate Antonio Di Pietro).

On the contrary, the centre-right coalition was unified thanks to a new alliance between Berlusconi and the Lega Nord leader Umberto Bossi, even if Bossi repeatedly attacked the incumbent Mayor describing him as a "man of power" while his party was at the side of the people.

Voting system
The semipresidential voting system was the one used for all mayoral elections in Italy of cities with a population higher than 15,000 for the third time. Under this system voters express a direct choice for the Mayor or an indirect choice voting for the party of the candidate's coalition. If no candidate receives at least 50% of votes, the top two candidates go to a second round after two weeks. This gives a result whereby the winning candidate may be able to claim majority support.

The election of the City Council is based on a direct choice for the candidate with a preference vote: the candidate with the majority of the preferences is elected. The number of the seats for each losing party is determined proportionally.

Parties and candidates
This is a list of the major parties (and their respective leaders) which participated in the election.

Results

References

2001 elections in Italy
Milan
Milan
Elections in Milan